Ryan Palmer (born 13 August 1987) is an English darts player currently playing in the Professional Darts Corporation. He is married to Sophy and has two sons.

Known as "The Lion", he won a PDC Tour Card at Q-School in 2016, and qualified for the 2017 UK Open, where he lost in the second round to Daryl Gurney. (6-3).

Ryan is currently the South West Title holder after finishing #1 in the region in 2021. He successfully defended his title in July 2022 beating fellow Bristolian Mitch Davies 7-2

Ryan is Currently playing on the Modus Super series, Pdc CT & ADC tours

References

External links
Profile and Stats on Darts Database

1987 births
Professional Darts Corporation former tour card holders
English darts players
Living people
Sportspeople from Bristol